Tips from the Top Floor is a podcast which presents tips and tricks about photography, mainly digital photography, in episodes normally ranging from 5 to 15 minutes in length and covering topics from image composition to post processing.

Podcast
, there are more than 800 episodes of the show, both in audio and video format. The show is aimed mainly at beginner digital photographers, though the content is suitable for all levels of photographer. It is produced in English and hosted by Chris Marquardt, a photographer, sound professional, musician and media producer. Some shows are produced along with Leo Laporte's show, The Tech Guy and broadcast on the Premiere Radio Network as well as Sirius XM Satellite Radio.

Awards
In 2005, the show won a Podcast Award in the Education category. It was nominated in the same category again in 2006 and 2007.

Photocastnetwork
The podcast is also the flagship show of the Photocast Network, a community of podcasters producing content related to photography.

References

External links 
 

Audio podcasts
Technology podcasts
Works about photography
2005 podcast debuts
American podcasts